Kingswood is a suburb in western Sydney, in the state of New South Wales in Australia. It is 52 kilometres west of the Sydney central business district, in the local government area of the City of Penrith. There are various other locations within the state of New South Wales that are also called Kingswood, and is often confused with the nearby suburb of Kingswood Park.

History
Kingswood was named after the family of Governor Philip Gidley King, who owned land in the area which was originally heavily forested. In 1881, the area was known as Crossroads for the intersection of the Great Western Highway and The Northern Road (now Parker Street). The name was changed to Kingswood on 2 August 1887. Cross Roads West Post Office opened on 20 April 1887 and was renamed Kingswood in August 1887.

The land was used for farming and subdivision began after the railway came through in 1862, although the Kingswood siding did not open until 1887.

The NSW State Archives and Reading Room (formerly known as Western Sydney Records Repository), where NSW public sector bodies' records are stored, is located on O'Connell Street, Kingswood.

Demographics
According to the 2016 census of population, there were 9,301 people in Kingswood.
 Aboriginal and Torres Strait Islander people made up 4.3% of the population. 
 64.5% of people were born in Australia. The next most common countries of birth were India 5.0%, England 3.0%, New Zealand 2.1%, Philippines 2.0% and China 1.2%.   
 69.7% of people spoke only English at home. Other languages spoken at home included Punjabi 2.8%, Malayalam 1.9%, Mandarin 1.3%, Nepali 1.2% and Hindi 1.2%.
 Their median age was 34 years, 4 years younger than the national median of 38. Children aged under 15 years made up 20.8% of the population (18.7% nationally) and people aged 65 years and over made up 13.2% of the population (15.7% nationally).
 The most common responses for religion were Catholic 24.4%, No Religion 23.6% and Anglican 17.1%.

Transport
Kingswood Railway Station is on the North Shore & Western Line of the Sydney Trains network.

Schools
Government
Kingswood Public School - primary school
Kingswood South Public School - primary school
Kingswood High School

Private
St. Josephs Primary School
St Dominics College run by the Christian Brothers

Tertiary education

Western Sydney University's Penrith campus is divided across the suburbs of Kingswood and Werrington. The university is accessible from both Werrington and Kingswood railway stations.
The Nepean College of TAFE, Kingswood Campus is also located in Kingswood.

Governance
At a local government level, Kingswood is part Penrith City Council, with the suburb divided into all three wards. At the state level, it is part of the Electoral district of Penrith, represented by the Liberal Party's Stuart Ayres. Federally, it is part of the Division of Lindsay, represented by Liberal Party Melissa McIntosh.

Churches

In 1897, four blocks of Crown land were given to the residents of Kingswood for a Church and Cemetery (later not required due to the dedication of Penrith General Cemetery). The Church was completed in 1898, the contractor was Jack Melville with ironwork provided by local blacksmith James Wainwright. The western porch was added later. Opened in 1898, the Church was not consecrated until 1959. A new Sunday school hall was completed in 1958 (now demolished).

References

Archival Holdings 

 NRS 15051, Photographic Collection. Item [1038] Kingswood High School (01/01/1970 - 31/12/1970). State Archives and Records Authority of New South Wales
 NRS 3829, School Files. State Archives and Records Authority of New South Wales

External links

 SchoPublic ol and related records index
 Penrith Local Suburb Profiles

Suburbs of Sydney
City of Penrith